Hayley Higham (born 3 January 1974, in Dorchester) is a British runner. She is the sister-in-law of fellow British runner Liz Yelling. 

She works as a Maths teacher at Sir William Borlase's Grammar School in Marlow, Buckinghamshire and runs for the Windsor, Slough, Eton and Hounslow Athletic Club. She has competed for England in the Commonwealth Games and for Great Britain in a number of competitions. In December 2004 she won the European Cross Country Championship in Heringsdorf.

In December 2009 she won the European Cross Country Championship in Dublin after coming out of retirement from competitive running. She followed this up a month later by coming fourth in the 2010 International Edinburgh Cross Country, fourteen seconds after winner Tirunesh Dibaba over the freezing 5.8 kilometre course.

Career highlights

British National Championships
2002 - 1st, 5,000 m
2003 - 1st, 10,000 m
2003 - 1st, 5,000 m
2006 - 1st, 5,000 m

Other competitions
2004 - 1st, European Cross Country Championships
2007 - 1st, Cross Internacional de San Sebastián
2008 - 1st, Belfast International Cross Country
2009 - 1st, European Cross Country Championships

Personal bests

References

External links

Living people
1974 births
English female long-distance runners
British female long-distance runners
English female middle-distance runners
World Athletics Championships athletes for Great Britain
Sportspeople from Dorchester, Dorset
European Cross Country Championships winners
AAA Championships winners